Kidyayev or Kidyaev is a Russian masculine surname, its feminine counterpart is Kidyayeva or Kidyaeva. It may refer to
Aleksandr Kidyayev (born 1940), Soviet weightlifter
Viktor Kidyayev (born 1956), Russian politician 
Yury Kidyayev (born 1955), Soviet handball player 

Russian-language surnames